Hubbardia may refer to:
 Hubbardia, a genus of grasses in the family Poaceae
 Hubbardia (arachnid), a genus of arachnids in the family Hubbardiidae